Club Deportivo Jorge Wilstermann, known simply as Wilstermann, is a Bolivian football club from the city of Cochabamba, founded on 24 November 1949 by a group of workers of Lloyd Aereo Boliviano. It is named after Bolivian aviator Jorge Wilstermann. Wilstermann is one of the three most frequent winners of the Primera Division de Bolivia and the first Bolivian team to qualify to the Copa Libertadores semi-finals.

History
On November 24, 1949, a group of employees of Lloyd Aéreo Boliviano met to form a football club that would be identified with the company and become the pride of its workers. After two hours of debate, they founded the club with the name "San Jose de la Banda" in tribute to the area and the airport in Cochabamba. They proceeded to the election of the board, and appointed Justo Mancilla as club president. After some debate, blue and white were chosen as the team colors.

After the death of the company's first commercial pilot in Bolivia, Jorge Wilstermann, the name of the club was changed. In 1953, Captain Walter Lemma, manager of the company and partner of the deceased, suggested that both the airport and the team bear the name of the pilot, who had been very dear to the institution.

After the club's foundation, the leaders entered it in Cochabamba's Football Association (AFC) to compete in the second division. Wilstermann had no clear rival for first place and its good campaign forced it to seek to move into the AFC championship, which was played in La Paz and Oruro between teams from those cities.

When Dr. Jorge Rojas was appointed Wilstermann's chairman, he changed its colors to red and blue. "I chose those colors because they mean force, ferocity, and total dedication in the field", he stated. It was also the only team in the country which used those colors.

Golden ages

First golden era
Wilstermann's first national title came in 1958. This was the first in the club's "golden age", highlighted by star players such as Walter Zamorano, Mario Zabalaga, José Carlos Trigo, César Sánchez, Máximo Alcócer, Ausberto García, Renán López, Alfredo Soria, Rómulo Cortez, Wilfredo Villarroel, José Trujillo, and José Rocabado. At that time, Wilstermann was the only team in Bolivia that played with five forwards, which shattered defenses.

In 1959, Wilstermann repeated as national champions, earning the honor to be the representative Bolivian side in the first edition of the Copa Libertadores de América in 1960. Their initial match pitted them against Peñarol of Uruguay. The Uruguayans defeated Wilstermann 7–1 in Montevideo, although the Bolivians drew their home game 1–1. In 1960, Wilstermann won its third consecutive national title, an achievement that has not been equalled by any other Bolivian club.

In the 1961 Copa competition, Wilster played to a tie against Santa Fe, Colombia, winning 3–2 in Cochabamba and losing 1–0 in Colombia. The governing body decided to draw lots to determine which team would advance to the next round. "The draw was a fraud. After many years we learned that the full intention of the South American Football Confederation, which at that time was based in Bogota, was to eliminate Wilstermann and promote Santa Fe to the semi-finals," claimed then Wilster club chairman, the late Jorge Rojas. The unsubstantiated story was that both of the pieces of paper that were put in the hat had Wilstermann's name. The team that was drawn was eliminated. "The Confederation official of that process confessed that he had been forced to proceed in this manner," recalled Rojas.

Second golden era
Wilstermann enjoyed a second "golden era" in the 1970s under the chairmanship of Alfredo Salazar. The Wilstermann team again won the national championships in 1972 and 1973. "They were spectacular years. Wilstermann had that mystique of a winning team: they did not like to lose ever, even less to a visiting side. Besides they were always on the attack and even achieved a historic 2–2 tie with River Plate in Buenos Aires," recalls Antonio Yanez, organization leader since 1975.

The Wilstermann sides of this era were highlighted by players such as Rene Bilbao, Hugo Pérez, Jaime Olivera, Juan José Ponce, Limbert Cabrera Rivero, Freddy Vargas, Juan Carlos Sánchez, Hugo Franco, Carlos Canelas, Alberto Navarro, Brazilian Milton Teodoro Joana, Chilean's Juan Abel Gangas and Victor Hugo Bravo.

Third golden era
Following a period of club organizational turmoil and the founding of the professional football league of Bolivia, the Liga de Fútbol Profesional Boliviano, Wilstermann enjoyed its third "golden age", winning national titles in 1980 and 1981.

During this period, the team looked to achieve something sought unsuccessfully by many Bolivian football clubs before: qualifying for the second phase of the Copa Libertadores de America. In opening Copa round play, Wilster beat good teams Técnico Universitario, Ambato and Barcelona SC. To seal their qualification for the second round, Wilstermann beat The Strongest 4–1 in the match tiebreaker in a memorable match at the stadium Estadio Ramón Tahuichi Aguilera in Santa Cruz de la Sierra, Bolivia.

In the second phase, Wilstermann faced the formidable rosters of Deportivo Cali of Colombia and Flamengo of Brazil. They first tied the Colombian side 1–1 in Cochabamba, but fell 1–0 in Cali. The team from Rio de Janeiro defeated Wilster 2–1 at home, as well as in Maracanã, 4–1. While these results were disappointing, Wilstermann had accomplished what no Bolivian team had before.
The Wilstermann sides of this era were highlighted by players such as Roger Pérez, Carlos Trigo, Víctor Villalón, Carlos Arias, Eduardo Navarro, Jhonny Villarroel, Freddy Vargas, César Enriquez, Jairzinho, Gastón Taborga and Freddy Salguero.

Achievements

National honours
First Division – Liga de Fútbol Profesional Boliviano/División de Fútbol Profesional Era: 15
1957*, 1958*, 1959*, 1960, 1967, 1972, 1973 (* Torneo Nacional), 1980, 1981, 2000, 2006-ST, 2010-A, 2016-C, 2018-A, 2019-C
Runners-up (7): 1965, 1974, 

Second Division, Copa Simón Bolivar: 0
Copa Bolivia: 3
1976, 1991, 1998
Runners-up (2): 1989, 2002

Copa Aerosur: 2
2004, 2011
Runners-up (4): 2003, 2008, 2009, 2010

Record in CONMEBOL competitions
Copa Libertadores: 15 appearances
Best – Semi-finals in 1981

Copa Sudamericana: 2 appearances
2007 – First round
2014 – First round

Recopa Sudamericana: 0 appearances
Copa CONMEBOL: 1 appearance
1998 – Quarter-finals

Current squad
As of 1 January, 2023.

Summer 2023

In

Out

Out on loan

Reserves and academy

Coaching staff

Managers

 Rubén Darío Insúa (Jan 1997–??)
 Dalcio Giovagnoli (1998)
 Jorge Habegger (July 1, 1999 – June 30, 2000)
 Dalcio Giovagnoli (2002–03)
 Luis Manuel Blanco (2004)
 Mauricio Soria (July 1, 2006 – April 9, 2007)
 Rubén Darío Insúa (Jan 1, 2007 – June 30, 2007)
 Mauricio Soria (April 16, 2008 – April 21, 2009)
 Eduardo Villegas (Jan 1, 2009 – Oct 30, 2009)
 Marcelo Neveleff (Jan 14, 2011 – April 16, 2012)
 Claudio Chacior (April 2011 – April 12)
 Mauricio Soria (May 2012 – Dec 12)
 Victor Hugo Andrada (Jan 1, 2013 – Sept 30, 2013)
 Néstor Clausen (July 1, 2013 – Dec 31, 2013)
 Marcelo Carballo (Dec 2013)
 Manuel Alfaro (Jan 1, 2014 – March 25, 2014)
 Marcelo Carballo (March 26, 2013 – May 25, 2014)
 Julio César Baldivieso (June 3, 2014 – Dec 21, 2014)
 Juan Manuel Llop (Jan 5, 2015 – Dec 23, 2015)
 Julio Alberto Zamora (Jan 2, 2016 – Dec 06, 2016)
 Roberto Mosquera (Jan 5, 2017 – Nov 6, 2017)
 Álvaro Peña (Nov 10, 2017 – Dic 19, 2018)
 Miguel Angel Portugal (Jan 2, 2019 – April 21, 2019)
 Christian Díaz (Jun 2, 2019 – Jan 1, 2021) 
 Mauricio Soria (Jan 4, 2021 – April 26, 2021)
 Diego Cagna (April 29, 2021 – Sep 24, 2021)
 Miguel Ponce (Jan 3, 2022 – April 16, 2022)
 Álvaro Peña (June 7, 2022 – August 4, 2022)
 Alberto Illanes (August 8, 2022 – January 3, 2023)
 Andrés Marinangeli (January 5, 2023 – January 23, 2023)
 Christian Díaz (January 23, 2023 – ...)

References

External links

 
Fan site
Fan site

 
Association football clubs established in 1949
Wilstermann
1949 establishments in Bolivia